Rachelle Cordova better known by the stage name Reina del Cid, is an American singer-songwriter and lead of the eponymous folk/rock band formerly based in Minneapolis, and now based in Los Angeles.

Early life and education 
Del Cid was born in Fargo, North Dakota at March 8, 1988. She earned a Bachelor of Arts degree in English literature from the University of Minnesota in 2010.

Career 
After graduating from college, she worked as an editorial assistant for University of Minnesota Press. Her stage name originates from references to Spanish literature. She nicknamed her guitar "El Cid" after the Castilian nobleman of the same name, and adopted the name "Reina," meaning "queen" in Spanish, because she colloquially regarded herself as queen of her guitar.

Del Cid and her band have released five studio albums to date: "blueprints, plans" (credited to "Reina del Cid & the Cidizens") released in 2012, "The Cooling" in 2015, "Rerun City" in 2017, "Morse Code" in 2019 and "Candy Apple Red" in 2022. "The Cooling" and "Rerun City" were recorded at Pachyderm Studios. Songs from the second album were featured on NPR, and Baeble Music. Their subsequent single release, "Death Cap" — along with its accompanying music video, which was filmed in Iceland — were featured in Paste Magazine.

Del Cid and her band have developed a significant following on their YouTube channel as independent artists. She regularly releases original songs and covers for her video series, Sunday Mornings with Reina del Cid.

In July 2019, del Cid announced the release of a full-length album, Morse Code. It was officially released on October 4, 2019, with a kick-off concert at The Cedar Cultural Center in Minneapolis.

In early 2020, just before the COVID-19 pandemic, Reina relocated to Los Angeles and lived with her bandmate Toni Lindgren. Her fifth studio album, Candy Apple Red, was officially released on April 28, 2022 at a concert at the Turf Club in Minneapolis.

Del Cid and Lindgren frequently perform in YouTube videos and on tour with singer-songwriter Joshua Lee Turner and Carson McKee.

Band members
 Reina del Cid – lead vocals and rhythm guitar
 Toni Lindgren – lead guitar and backup vocals
 Andrew Foreman – bass
 Nate Babbs – drums
 Zach Schmidt – drums (2014–2018)

Discography
 blueprints, plans – Released September 15, 2012 (Credited to Reina del Cid & the Cidizens)
 The Cooling – Released June 16, 2015
 Rerun City – Released December 8, 2017
 Morse Code – Released October 4, 2019
 Candy Apple Red – Released April 28, 2022

References

External links
 
 

1988 births
Living people
21st-century American singers
21st-century American women singers
21st-century American women guitarists
American women singer-songwriters
American folk rock musicians
Musical groups from the Twin Cities
Musicians from North Dakota
Singer-songwriters from North Dakota